Johann Hermann Carmiencke or John Hermann Carmiencke (born at Hamburg in 1810; died at Brooklyn, New York on 15 June 1867) was a landscape painter and etcher.

Biography
He went to Dresden in 1831 as a journeyman painter, and while there studied in Dahl's school. Thence he went to Copenhagen in 1834, where he studied in the Academy, and, after moving to Leipzig, received instruction there from Sohonberg. Returning to Copenhagen in 1838, he proceeded to travel as an artist in Sweden, Bavaria, and the Tyrol, visiting Italy from 1845 to 1846. He was then appointed court painter to Christian VIII, for whom he executed many works.

In consequence of the First Schleswig War, he went in 1851 to New York, where he was well received, and admitted into the Academy of Brooklyn, and the Artists' Fund Society, in which he was very active. He was a successful teacher.

Works
His works were mainly groups of mountain ranges, which were very effectively rendered, and possessed an excellent tone — the execution being simple and true to nature. The Mountain Tarn and the View on the Zillerthal may be particularly noticed. There are thirty-five careful etchings of landscapes by him, some of which were published by the Art Association of Copenhagen in 1850 and 1851.

Notes

References
 
Attribution:

External links

 
 

1810 births
1867 deaths
Court painters
German landscape painters
American landscape painters
Artists from Hamburg
Artists from New York City
Royal Danish Academy of Fine Arts alumni
German emigrants to the United States
19th-century German painters
19th-century German male artists
German male painters
Hudson River School painters